James Rankin (February 20, 1844 – January 5, 1921) was a lighthouse keeper in the United States.

A native of Killashee, County Longford, Ireland, Rankin emigrated to the United States in 1867. He served in the U.S. Lighthouse Service as the keeper of East Brother Island Light in California from 1877 to 1878. He then transferred to Fort Point Light in San Francisco, where he remained for 40 years, until retiring in 1919. During his tenure he was credited with saving the lives of 18 people.

Rankin died in Antioch, California, where he had moved soon after retiring.

In 1997, the United States Coast Guard named a  buoy tender USCGC James Rankin (WLM-555) in his honor. Its homeport is Curtis Bay, Baltimore.

References

External links
 Coast Guard bio
 

1844 births
1921 deaths
Irish emigrants to the United States (before 1923)
People from Antioch, California
People from County Longford
United States Lighthouse Service personnel